Fondazione Unione Sportiva Petrarca is an Italian amateur sports club based in Padua. The club was formed in 1912 by the Jesuits.

Although nationally and internationally the U.S. Petrarca is known mainly for its association with rugby, the club is involved with a number of other sports as well:

Petrarca Rugby (rugby union)
A.S. Petrarca Calcio (Association football)
Pallacanestro Petrarca Padova (Basketball)
Petrarca Pallavolo (Volleyball)
Petrarca Calcio a Cinque (Futsal)
Associazione Sportiva Petrarca Scherma (Fencing)
Petrarca Nuoto (Swimming)

References 
The information in this article is based on that in its Italian equivalent.

External links
  Tutto lo sport del Petrarca!

Sport in Padua